Omagh College of Further Education (often referred to as just Omagh College or "The Tech" by locals) is a college in Omagh, County Tyrone in Northern Ireland. The college is based in one central campus in the Town Centre (however up until recently it was three campuses spread out throughout the whole urban area). In 2007 it became part of the new South West College.

Location
The campus building is located directly north of the main town centre, fronting the River Strule and conveniently next to the town's main bus station. Opposite the river is the location of what will be the Omagh Civic Arts Centre (completion due sometime around October 2007), and already a planned pedestrian bridge will link the two landmark buildings.

Building
The college building is very modern (having only opened in October 2005) four-story building, with some of the best facilities in Northern Ireland. The building comprises a curved central area, with 'wings' coming out of the North and West sides. Expanding from the North Wing is a one-story block consisting of mechanical workshops. The North-West area of the site is a large car park (parking lot) with disabled parking.

Areas of the College:
Curved Wing
Industrial Area
North Wing
West Wing

Courses
The college offers many full-time and part-time courses in the following subjects:

Full-Time
Health & Social Care 
Hairdressing & Beauty Therapy 
Fashion & Arts 
Computing & Information Technology 
Business Studies 
Sport, Leisure & Tourism 
Catering & Hospitality 
Construction, Electrical & Engineering 
Environmental/Agricultural 
Electronics & Technology 
Media & Design

Part-Time
Health & Social Care 
Hairdressing & Beauty Therapy 
Fashion, Arts & Design 
Computing & Information Technology 
Business & Professional Development 
Sport & Leisure 
Catering & Hospitality 
Construction, Electrical & Engineering 
Construction Electrical & Engineering Operations 
Electronics & Electrical 
Environmental/Agricultural 
Higher Education 
Hobbies & Personal Interests 
Community, Health & Social Practice 
Computing & Graphic Design 
Finance, Business & Professional Development 
Personal Development

Resources & Facilities
Learning Resource Centre
Hair & Beauty Centre
Conference Centre
Student Social Area
College Bistro
'The Gallery' Restaurant
Community Outreach Centres
Car parking
Crèche Facilities
Video Conferencing Suite
Student Union

External links

Omagh
Further education colleges in Northern Ireland